Jack-Jack Attack  is a 2005 American computer animated short film produced by Pixar and written and directed by Brad Bird. The short film is a spin-off on his 2004 film The Incredibles.

Unlike many of their previous shorts, it was not given a theatrical release, but was included on the DVD release of the film. The idea for this short came from an idea for a scene originally considered for inclusion in the film The Incredibles; it was cut from the feature and subsequently expanded into this short. The short is based on the baby, Jack-Jack, and takes place at around the same time as the events of the main film. From The Incredibles, the audience knows that Jack-Jack's babysitter Kari McKeen started experiencing difficulty with him shortly after hanging up the phone with his mother, Helen Parr (also known as Elastigirl).

Plot
This short film shows Rick Dicker, a government agent assigned to aid "supers" in maintaining their anonymity, interviewing Kari McKeen (the babysitter the Parr family hired to watch Jack-Jack during the events of The Incredibles) about the events unfolded while she was babysitting Jack-Jack Parr, the youngest of a family of supers.

Kari begins by stating that she received a call from Helen Parr, who expresses reluctance about allowing Kari to babysit. Kari attempts to reassure her that she is more than capable of taking care of Jack-Jack, but the conversation is cut off by Helen's jet being fired upon. Thinking nothing is wrong, and that they were simply cut-off, Kari turns her attention to Jack-Jack. She begins by playfully asking Jack-Jack if he is ready for some "neurological stimulation" and plays Mozart's Piano Sonata No. 11 (third movement) for him, which results in Jack-Jack having an epiphany about his latent superpowers.

When Kari's back is turned, Jack-Jack seems to disappear and reappear in the kitchen drinking a baby bottle. Finding this odd, Kari tries to call Helen again. While she is leaving a message, Jack-Jack floats onto the ceiling and spills milk onto Kari's face. Kari puts him in his playpen, flipped upside-down so that he doesn't float away, and tries calling Helen again. Jack-Jack escapes the playpen and appears on a high bookshelf. Just as he falls, Kari dives in and tries to catch him, but fails when Jack-Jack passes through the floor into the laundry room. Running down to find him, Kari sees Jack-Jack passing through the walls and floating around, babbling happily, before she finally catches him.

Kari takes Jack-Jack back upstairs, ties him to a barbell and tries to show him flashcards to calm him down. This works well until she shows him a card of a campfire, at which point he suddenly burst into flames. Horrified, Kari picks up Jack-Jack with the pair of fireplace tongs and rushes into the bathroom, where she douses him in the bathtub.

The next day, an exhausted Kari is teetering on the verge of madness, but has since learned to anticipate and counter the spontaneous outbursts of Jack-Jack's newly emerged powers. There is a knock at the door; Kari answers it and meets Syndrome, who asks if this is the Parrs' residence. Kari thinks he is the new babysitter come to relieve her, but wonders what the "S" on his costume stands for. He claims that it stands for "Sitter" because if he calls himself "Babysitter", his uniform will have to say "BS" on it, something that would make it impossible for parents to take him seriously as a result.

Cutting back to the interrogation scene, Dicker is incredulous that Kari believed Syndrome and left the baby in his care, to which Kari defensively shouts that she was not in a sound state of mind at the time and the baby was not acting normal. Dicker then asks Kari if she had told anyone else about the incident, to which she replies that she told her parents, who did not believe her and thought she was joking. As Kari expresses her wish to forget the whole event, Dicker promises that she will, and activates a device to erase her memory.

Cast

 Bret Parker as Kari McKeen, the babysitter for Jack-Jack.
 Eli Fucile as Jack-Jack Parr, who, as Mr. Incredible and Elastigirl's infant son, initially shows no sign of super power but is later revealed to have a wide range of abilities including shape-shifting, teleporting, laser vision, elemental transmutation, flight, etc.
 Bud Luckey as Rick Dicker, the government agent overseeing the Relocation Program.
 Jason Lee as Buddy Pine / Syndrome, an evil genius who uses advanced technology to give himself superpowers. He plays along as the frantic Kari mistakes him as the "replacement babysitter".

Home video release
Pixar included the film on the DVD release of The Incredibles in 2005, and as part of Pixar Short Films Collection, Volume 1 in 2007.

Awards
 2006: Hugo Award for Best Dramatic Presentation - Short Form (Nominated)

References

External links

 
 
 

2005 computer-animated films
2005 short films
2000s American animated films
2000s animated short films
Films scored by Michael Giacchino
Films directed by Brad Bird
Pixar short films
Teleportation in fiction
The Incredibles
Films with screenplays by Mark Andrews
2000s English-language films
American animated short films
American direct-to-video films
Films about babies
Disney direct-to-video animated films
2005 direct-to-video films